There's a Situation on the Homefront is a studio album by American hip hop group Tha Grimm Teachaz. It was originally released in 2010.

Critical reception

In 2011, Pitchfork included it on the "Overlooked Mixtapes" list. Writing for Pitchfork, Jeff Weiss described it as "a high-concept parody/love letter to the Golden Age, with a guest spot from Son Doobie and beats ostensibly raided from one of Buckwild's dusty crates." Ben Westhoff of The Guardian said: "It's both a parody of, and a homage to, early 90s hip-hop, in which Serengeti raps from the perspective of a middle-aged white man named Kenny Dennis, an overweight telephone-booth repairman and family man who was formerly signed to Jive and beefed with Shaq."

Track listing

References

External links
 

2010 albums
Serengeti (rapper) albums
Anticon albums